The 1894 Colgate football team represented Colgate University in the 1894 college football season. The team captain for the 1894 season was Spencer Ford.

Schedule

References

Colgate
Colgate Raiders football seasons
Colgate football